Members, Don't Git Weary is an album by American jazz drummer Max Roach recorded in 1968 and released on the Atlantic label.

Reception

Allmusic awarded the album 4 stars and the review by Alex Henderson calls it "One of the finest post-bop dates Roach recorded during that decade".

Track listing
All compositions by Stanley Cowell except as indicated
 "Abstrutions" - 3:40   
 "Libra" (Gary Bartz) - 4:58   
 "Effi" - 6:15   
 "Equipoise" - 6:22   
 "Members, Don't Git Weary" (Max Roach) - 5:32   
 "Absolutions" (Jymie Merritt) - 4:39  
Recorded in New York on June 25 (tracks 2-4 & 6) and June 26 (tracks 1 & 5), 1968

Personnel 
Max Roach - drums
Charles Tolliver - trumpet
Gary Bartz - alto saxophone
Stanley Cowell - piano, electric piano
Jymie Merritt  - electric bass
Andy Bey - vocals (track 5)

References 

1968 albums
Max Roach albums
Atlantic Records albums
Albums produced by Joel Dorn